A transition radiation detector (TRD) is a particle detector using the -dependent threshold of transition radiation in a stratified material. It contains many layers of materials with different indices of refraction.  At each interface between materials, the probability of transition radiation increases with the relativistic gamma factor.  Thus particles with large  give off many photons, and small  give off few.  For a given energy, this allows a discrimination between a lighter particle (which has a high  and therefore radiates) and a heavier particle (which has a low  and radiates much less).

The passage of the particle is observed through many thin layers of material put in air or gas. The radiated photon gives energy deposition by photoelectric effect, and the signal is detected as ionization. Usually materials with low  are preferred for the radiator, while for photons materials with high  are used to get a high cross section for photoelectric effect (ex. ). 

TRD detectors are used in ALICE and ATLAS experiment at Large Hadron Collider. The ALICE TRD operates together with a big TPC (Time Projection Chamber) and TOF (Time of Flight counter) to do particle identification in ion collisions. The ATLAS TRD is called TRT (Transition Radiation Tracker) which serves also as a tracker measuring particles' trajectory simultaneously.

Particle detectors